Norman Fairclough (born 1941) is an emeritus Professor of Linguistics at Department of Linguistics and English Language at Lancaster University. He is one of the founders of critical discourse analysis (CDA) as applied to sociolinguistics. CDA is concerned with how power is exercised through language. CDA studies discourse; in CDA this includes texts, talk, video and practices.

Methodology of CDA
Fairclough's line of study, also called textually oriented discourse analysis or TODA, to distinguish it from philosophical enquires not involving the use of linguistic methodology, is specially concerned with the mutual effects of formally linguistic textual properties, sociolinguistic speech genres, and formally sociological practices. The main thrust of his analysis is that, if —according to Foucauldian theory— practices are discursively shaped and enacted, the intrinsic properties of discourse, which are linguistically analysable, are to constitute a key element of their interpretation. He is thus interested in how social practices are discursively shaped, as well as the subsequent discursive effects of social practices.

Language and Power (1989; now in a revised third edition 2014) explored the between language and social institutional practices and of "wider" political and social structures. In the book Fairclough developed the concept of synthetic personalisation to account for the linguistic effects providing an appearance of direct concern and contact with the individual listener in mass-crafted discourse phenomena, such as advertising, marketing, and political or media discourse. This is seen as part of a larger-scale process of technologisation of discourse, which  the increasingly subtle technical developments in the field of communication that aim to bring under scientifically regulated practice semiotic fields that were formerly considered suprasegmental, such as patterns of intonation, the graphic layout of text on the page or proxemic data.

His book New Labour, New Language? looks at the rhetoric used by the Labour Party in the United Kingdom, with a particular focus on the party's developments towards New Labour.

Influences
Fairclough's theories have been influenced by Mikhail Bakhtin and Michael Halliday in linguistics and by ideology theorists such as Antonio Gramsci, Louis Althusser, Michel Foucault, and Pierre Bourdieu in sociology.

Honorary degrees
Dr.phil.h.c., Aalborg University, 2004
Honorary Doctorate, University of Jyväskylä, Finland

Publications

Books
Fairclough, Norman (1989). Language and Power. London: Longman.
Fairclough, Norman (1992). Discourse and Social Change. Cambridge: Polity Press.
Fairclough, Norman (1995). Media Discourse. London: Edward Arnold.
Fairclough, Norman (1995). Critical Discourse Analysis. Boston: Addison Wesley.
Chouliaraki, Lilie and Norman Fairclough (1999). Discourse in Late Modernity – Rethinking Critical Discourse Analysis. Edinburgh: Edinburgh University Press.
Fairclough, Norman (2000). New Labour, New Language? London: Routledge.
Fairclough, Norman (2001). Language and Power (2nd edition). London: Longman.
Fairclough, Norman (2003). Analysing Discourse: Textual Analysis for Social Research. London: Routledge.
Fairclough, Norman (2006). Language and Globalization. London: Routledge.
Fairclough, Norman (2007). (Ed.). Discourse and Contemporary Social Change. Bern.
Fairclough, Isabela and Fairclough, Norman (2013) Political Discourse Analysis: A Method for Advanced Students. London: Routledge.
Fairclough, Norman (2014). Language and Power (3rd edition). London: Longman.
Fairclough, Norman (2014). Critical Language Awareness. London: Routledge.

Journal articles
Fairclough, Norman (1985). Critical and Descriptive Goals in Discourse Analysis. Journal of Pragmatics 9: 739–763.
Fairclough, Norman (1992). Discourse and Text: Linguistic Intertextual Analysis within Discourse Analysis. Discourse and Society 3(2): 193–217.
Fairclough, Norman (1993). Critical Discourse Analysis and the Marketisation of Public Discourse: The Universities. Discourse & Society 4(2): 133–168.
Fairclough, Norman (1996). A Reply to Henry Widdowson's 'Discourse Analysis: A Critical View'. Language & Literature 5(1): 49–56.
Fairclough, Norman (1996). Rhetoric and Critical Discourse Analysis: A Reply to Titus Ensink and Christoph Sauer. Current Issues in Language & Society 3(3): 286–289.
Fairclough, Norman (1999). Global Capitalism and Critical Awareness of Language. Language Awareness 8(2): 71–83. Available: <http://www.multilingual-matters.net/la/008/la0080071.htm>. 
Fairclough, Norman (2000). Discourse, Social Theory, and Social Research: The Discourse of Welfare Reform. Journal of Sociolinguistics 4(2): 163–195.
Fairclough, Norman (2000). Response to Carter and Sealey. Journal of Sociolinguistics 4(1): 25–29.
Fairclough, Norman (2001). The Dialectics of Discourse. Textus 14(2): 3–10. [Online]. Available (£6.00): <http://www.tilgher.it/textusart_fairclough.html>. [12 June 2002].
Fairclough, Norman (2002). Language in New Capitalism. Discourse & Society 13(2): 163–166.
Fairclough, Norman (2003). 'Political Correctness': The Politics of Culture and Language. Discourse & Society 14(1): 17–28.
Fairclough, Norman (2003). Review of Pennycook's Critical Applied Linguistics. Discourse & Society 14(6): 805–808.
Fairclough, Norman, Graham, Phil, Lemke, Jay & Wodak, Ruth (2004). Introduction. Critical Discourse Studies 1(1): 1–7.
Fairclough, Norman (2005). Peripheral Vision: Discourse Analysis in Organization Studies: The Case for Critical Realism. Organization Studies (Sage Publications Inc.) 26(6): 915–939.

Articles in edited books
Fairclough, Norman (1992). The Appropriacy of 'Appropriateness'. In Fairclough, Norman (Ed.), Critical Language Awareness. London: Routledge.
Fairclough, Norman (1993). Discourse and Cultural Change in the Enterprise Culture. In Graddol, David, Thompson, L. & Byram, M. (Eds.), Language and Culture, Clevedon: Multilingual Matters.
Fairclough, Norman (1996). Technologisation of Discourse. In Caldas-Coulthard, Carmen Rosa & Coulthard, Malcolm (Eds.), Texts and Practices: Readings in Critical Discourse Analysis, London: Routledge.
Fairclough, Norman & Mauranen, Anna (1998). The Conversationalisation of Political Discourse: A Comparative View. In Blommaert, Jan & Bulcaen, Chris (Eds.), Political Linguistics, Amsterdam: John Benjamins.
Fairclough, Norman (1999). Democracy and the Public Sphere in Critical Research on Discourse. In Wodak, Ruth & Ludwig, Christoph (Eds.), Challenges in a Changing World: Issues in Critical Discourse Analysis, Vienna: Passagen Verlag.
Fairclough, Norman (2001). Critical Discourse Analysis. In McHoul, Alec & Rapley, Mark (Eds.), How to Analyse Talk in Institutional Settings: A Casebook of Methods, London: Continuum.
Fairclough, Norman (2001). Critical Discourse Analysis as a Method  in Social Scientific Research. In Wodak, Ruth & Meyer, Michael (Eds.), Methods of Critical Discourse Analysis, London: Sage.
Fairclough, Norman (2001). The Discourse of New Labour: Critical Discourse Analysis. In Wetherell, Margaret, Taylor, Stephanie & Yates, Simeon (Eds.), Discourse as Data: A Guide for Analysis, London: Sage.

Edited books
Fairclough, Norman (Ed.) (1992). Critical Language Awareness. London: Longman.

References

External links
Staff page at Lancaster University

1941 births
Living people
Linguists from the United Kingdom
Sociolinguists
Academics of Lancaster University
Department of Linguistics and English Language, Lancaster University
Discourse analysts